Fabrizia D'Ottavio (born 3 February 1985 in Chieti) is an Italian former rhythmic gymnast. She started doing gymnastics when she was five years old. In 2002, she was selected for the national team and the very next year she debuted in an international tournament.

Biography
She was coached by gymnast and world champion Emanuela Maccarani.
She won the silver medal in the competition of rhythmic gymnastics group at Athens Olympics in 2004. She won the gold medal of  World Rhythmic Gymnastics Championships in Baku (Azerbaijan) in 2005 and silver medal at European Championships in Rhythmic Gymnastics of Moscow (Russia) in 2006. In 2008, after Beijing Olympics she announced her retirement from the national team, along with teammate Marinella Falca. In June 2009, Fabrizia was appointed as the mayor of the Village Mediterranean Chieti, for Mediterranean Games.

On 27 September 2004 she was honoured with the title Official Order of Merit of the Italian Republic initiated by the President of the Republic. 
In 2010 she was appointed as Italy's young ambassador to Singapore for the Inaugural Youth Olympic games.

References

External links 
 
 
 
  
  
 
 

1985 births
Living people
Italian rhythmic gymnasts
Olympic gymnasts of Italy
Olympic silver medalists for Italy
Olympic medalists in gymnastics
Gymnasts at the 2004 Summer Olympics
Medalists at the 2004 Summer Olympics
Medalists at the Rhythmic Gymnastics European Championships
Medalists at the Rhythmic Gymnastics World Championships
Sportspeople from Chieti
21st-century Italian women